Kristjan Asllani (born 9 March 2002) is an Albanian professional footballer who plays as a midfielder for  club Inter Milan, on loan from Empoli. He represents the Albania national team.

Personal life 
Asllani was born in Elbasan to Albanian parents, but soon relocated to Italy together with his family in the small Tuscan town of Buti, where he started playing football at the age of five with a small local team.

Club career

Empoli
Asllani made his professional debut for Empoli on 13 January 2021, in a Coppa Italia game against Napoli.

Inter
On 29 June 2022, Asllani joined Inter from Empoli for a fee of €14m. Empoli announced that the transfer is structured as a loan initially, with a subsequent Inter obligation to buy. Asllani scored his first goal in his first appearance in a friendly against F.C. Milano.

On 18 January 2023, Asllani won his first career trophy, the 2022 Supercoppa Italiana, as Inter defeated Milan 3–0 in King Fahd International Stadium; he was brought on in the 84th minute of the match.

International career
In June 2021, Asllani made his debut for Albania U21 in a friendly against Belgium U21. Having lived in Italy since the age of five, Asllani is eligible for Italy or Albania as he holds both citizenships, but chose to represent the latter.

Honours 
Inter Milan
 Supercoppa Italiana: 2022

References 

2002 births
Living people
Footballers from Elbasan
Albanian footballers
Association football midfielders
Empoli F.C. players
Inter Milan players
Serie A players
Albanian expatriate footballers
Albanian expatriate sportspeople in Italy
Expatriate footballers in Italy
Albania under-21 international footballers
Albania international footballers